Aricha is a small village located in the extreme south of Tlemcen Province in Northwestern Algeria. It lies at the intersection of Tlemcen Province in the north, the Wilaya de Sidi Bel Abbes to the east and south Wilaya of Naâma to the west the Moroccan border.

Geography and climate  

As with the arid climate and its place in the region of the steppe, it is first-class pastoral areas, sheep farming is the main supplier of the region so that the proportion of land suitable for the Agriculture, however, 14.5% an estimated area of 10,700 hectares of a total of 736.92 km on Wade 2nd quarter cup Middle Aricha to the west and surplus almost every year Vtemtla by wells, but most Floods have serious consequences, as is the case in 1984 where he died a man named Balkassem context of its campaign, or what happened in 2008, where many houses were demolished, and was Forced to abandon his family for several hours
Assigned to different committees to inspect the damage caused by floods in the municipality, "Aricha" in the month and the inventory of damages and interests, with the Office of the Technical Department of the Sebdou damaged 345 buildings, including 197 homes in urgent need of repair was converted to the interests of the state, which in turn transmitted to a cell in the crisis waiting to take measures to compensate those affected, either by through grants or equipment for the restoration of the expulsion, after the planning of housing projects of the municipality.

On the other hand, the state has a budget estimated $29 billion and 700 million centimes for the 3 major projects for the protection of the municipality of Aricha floods or other disasters. It was allocated an amount of 3700 billion cents to finish the bridge, amid billions of municipalities and 10 cents for the protection and creation of barriers on the banks of the Oued Aricha, 16 billion dollars of the proposed system sanitation and drainage of storm water affected by Tsaqtha.
But it is a harsh climate: hot in summer, more than 40 degrees and a cold winter, temperatures fall below 0 degrees, which led to the fall of the freezing night.
Aricha and stable under the conditions of the mountain, which is green dress Mkaidu pine trees and shrubs on the location of the village in the north as part of reforestation in the seventies of the same forest or trees during the colonial era were Aricha parks Alhdikpambassly "Althtanip" The increase in the park, "Alfoghanip.

People 
The population of Aricha in 1987 3108 people to move to 4831 people, a record, up by almost 1723 people, a rate of 55.4% or 5% per year, today that number has risen to the limit of 7734 people.

History 
Aricha formally founded in 1880 to Ajnralat Australia was inhabited only by a group of nomads, who then took advantage of the abundant flora and diversity of the allies and the Rue Aldez and other plants rich region for raising livestock.
And settled a group of settlers and also built the Center of the National Gendarmerie and moved there is a group of residents of the town of Tlemcen Iskaroa and engage in trade with the nomadic population. Tmma soon settled a group of people to be the nucleus of the first Hth village.

Social village structure  
Tribes is a Ahmian tribes, the largest proportion of the Aricha Itlohm and after the throne of children of the day to a group of Berber from major tribes, three families are known. There are also families came from the confines of the Sahara, although they Alhassasnp assigned Ahmian later because of the division, which France has been given to both Folha Aricha "Qaydin:" Kaid "for the children of the day and "Kaid" in Ahmian. If the score is still the legal entity that separates the two sides of National Highway No. 99 and includes the north of the village Nharalcracp children, Alamoroacharfpogerhm Ahmian In the south, the Kabylie, and Alhassasnp.

Infrastructure  

The most important structures of the village consists of the headquarters of the municipality. E-center, center of the national gendarmerie, and another for customs and border guards.
There are three primary schools and secondary Ikamalep. And two mosques, one built in Altheliinat of the past century and a new one is under construction, which includes creative and beautiful.
And public life in the quiet town in Ihrkhaila weekly market held every Thursday, which is a rallying point for the entire population of the desert nomads who have settled on the outskirts of the village and the society in 1930. Football at the center of the Sahpalamomcip led by two doctors, dentists, nurses and 06 are under the Ministry of Health and Population.

References

Communes of Tlemcen Province
Tlemcen Province